Pay Doldol (also Romanized as Pāy Doldol) is a village in Nilkuh Rural District in the Central District of Galikash County, Golestan Province, Iran. At the 2006 census, its population was 391, in 105 families.

References 

Populated places in Galikash County